Michael France (January 4, 1962  April 12, 2013) was an American screenwriter. He is best remembered for writing the screenplays for Cliffhanger (1993), the James Bond film GoldenEye (1995), and the comic book films Hulk (2003), The Punisher (2004), and Fantastic Four (2005).

Early life
France was born in St. Petersburg, Florida. As a kid he loved comics and movies, which may have inspired him to write. He attended the University of Florida in the early 1980s, working as a projectionist at a small movie theater in Gainesville and participating in its programming. He earned a graduate degree from the film school at Columbia University in New York City.

Career
France moved to Los Angeles, California, where he sold the script for Cliffhanger. He later wrote the scripts for GoldenEye, Hulk, The Punisher, and Fantastic Four. He also did some uncredited work on The World Is Not Enough. France bought the historic Beach Theater in St. Petersburg, Florida; built in 1939, the theater is known for its screening of independent and foreign films.

Personal life
France lived in St. Pete Beach, Florida, with his wife, Elizabeth, and their three children, Annabelle and Carolynn, twins, age 10 at the time, and Thomas, age 15. He died on April 12, 2013, after complications resulting from diabetes. He was 51 years old.

References

External links

 The One-Page Screenplay: Michael France's Tips on Suicide Notes Movieline.com article, June 22, 2009
Star Trek fans get ready for the big premiere 10Connects.com article (with video), May 8, 2009
Shop Local: Beach Theatre The Daily Loaf article, December 11, 2008
A Hulk Free of Hang-ups St. Petersburg Times article June 14, 2008
The France Connection St. Petersburg Times article June 8, 2008
Hollywood meets 'Rocky Horror' PoynterOnline.org article July 2, 2007
Beach's Indy Icon Going Hollywood St. Petersburg Times  article April 12, 2007
Local screenwriter buys St. Pete Beach theater St. Petersburg Times article April 8, 2007
Floridian: Flexing his writer's muscle St. Petersburg Times article June 20, 2003
IGN: 10 Questions: Mike France June 19, 2003 interview
Countdown to 'Hulk': Screenwriter Michael France's Big, Green Vision Comic Book Resources interview, June 16, 2003
 Floridian: Riding Spider-Man's coattails St. Petersburg Times article May 10, 2002
The Beach Theatre Independent landmark movie theatre in St. Pete Beach, FL, owned by screenwriter Michael France. Built in 1939.
Newmarket Press biography

1962 births
2013 deaths
American male screenwriters
University of Florida alumni
Writers from St. Petersburg, Florida
Columbia University School of the Arts alumni
Deaths from diabetes
20th-century American writers
21st-century American writers
20th-century American male writers
Screenwriters from Florida